Pagodane is an organic compound with formula  whose carbon skeleton was said to resemble a pagoda, hence the name. It is a polycyclic hydrocarbon whose molecule has the D2h point symmetry group. The compound is a highly crystalline solid that melts at 243 °C, is barely soluble in most organic solvents and moderately soluble in benzene and chloroform. It sublimes at low pressure.

The name pagodane is used more generally for any member of a family of compounds whose molecular skeletons have the same 16-carbon central cage as the basic compound. Each member can be seen as the result of connecting eight atoms of this cage in pairs by four alkane chains. The general member is denoted [m.n.p.q]pagodane where m, n, p and q are the number of carbons of those four chains. The general formula is then  where s= m+n+p+q. In particular, the basic compound  has those carbons connected by four methylene bridges (m=n=p=q=1), and its name within that family is therefore [1.1.1.1]pagodane.

Synthesis and structure
The compound was first synthesized by Horst Prinzbach and his associates in 1987, by a 14-step sequence starting from isodrin. In the process they also synthesized [2.2.1.1]pagodane  and several derivatives.

Prinzbach remarked that "the obvious need for [the short name 'pagodane'] can be readily understood in view of the von Baeyer/IUPAC and Chemical Abstracts nomenclature", undecacyclo[9.9.0.01,5.02,12.02,18.03,7.06,10.08,12.011,15.013,17.016,20]icosane.

In carbon skeleton of pagodane, there can be distinguished many propellane-type fragments.

The overall synthesis can be summarized as follows:

The scheme depicted here may be shortened to 14 one-pot operations with 24% overall yield. Yet, this variation requires the use of tetrachlorothiophenedioxide instead of tetrachloro-dimethoxycyclopentadiene in two of the early steps. While fewer steps and higher yield look attractive at first sight, this approach had to be given up due to high cost and restricted availability of the dioxide.

Derivatives
Several derivatives are available, such as the diketone  (melting point about 322 °C).

Both [1.1.1.1]pagodane and [2.2.1.1]pagodane form divalent cations in /. In these cations the electron deficiency is spread over the central cyclobutane ring. These dications were the first examples to show the phenomenon of σ-bishomoaromaticity which was subsequently studied by the Prinzbach group to great length.

Pagodane is an isomer of dodecahedrane and can be chemically converted to it.

References

Polycyclic nonaromatic hydrocarbons
Cyclobutanes
Substances discovered in the 1980s